Jordan L. Anderson (born April 15, 1991) is an American professional stock car racing driver and team owner. He competes part-time in the NASCAR Craftsman Truck Series, driving the No. 3 Chevrolet Silverado for his team Jordan Anderson Racing.

Racing career

Anderson began racing in karts as an eight-year-old. He raced in Legends and Late model cars as his career developed. Anderson made one start in the NASCAR K&N Pro Series East in 2013 along with two starts in the CARS X-1R Pro Cup Series and various Late Model races. He made an April 2014 start in the K&N Pro Series East at Richmond with the intention of running the full season, but his car owner began writing bad checks and the team was forced to close down. Anderson then sold one of his own personally-owned Super Late Models to pay off the debt of his former car owner to keep his name clear of any debts.

As a rookie in the Camping World Truck Series, he drove the No. 50 Living Integrity Chevrolet Silverado for MAKE Motorsports in the second last race of 2014 at Phoenix, and then also competed for Mike Harmon Racing in the final race of 2014 season at Homestead-Miami. Anderson used his savings account to buy a truck to drive and qualify the Daytona race but failed to qualify. Anderson would continue driving for Harmon throughout the entire 2015 season finishing 19th in final driver points with a best finish of 13th at Michigan. Also during 2015, Anderson made his Xfinity Series debut for Harmon.

In 2016, Anderson joined Bolen Motorsports for the full Truck schedule, driving the No. 66 Silverado with sponsorship from Columbia, SC – Famously Hot. After securing the last qualifying spot to race at Daytona in February, the team went on to log 8 Top 20 finishes throughout the season. Anderson's truck garnered national attention in September as it was funded thanks in part to a "Fueled by Fans" campaign with over 120 fans sponsoring the truck to pay for a new motor for the team. Anderson would go on to finish in the Top 20 in the championship standings by only a mere point in the series for a second straight year. He also ran five Xfinity races in 2016, four for Obaika Racing and the season finale for Precision Performance Motorsports.

Anderson started off 2017 by failing to qualify at Daytona with Mike Harmon Racing. After his No. 12 truck (which borrowed owner points from Rick Ware Racing) crashed at Atlanta, Anderson was left with no truck to drive for the season and made a website – SponsorJordan.com – for the fans to fund him a truck. While raising funds, Anderson started and parked RSS Racing's second car. Due to the large time gaps between races, Anderson was back two races later at Kansas Speedway. He also ran one race in the NASCAR Xfinity Series for B. J. McLeod Motorsports, at Dover International Speedway. Starting at Kansas, Anderson teamed up with TJL Motorsports to use TJL's owner points while bringing his own equipment to the track. He missed two races due to TJL having other drivers signed to drive, but otherwise ran the rest of the season and would go on to finish in the top 20 in the CWTS driver points for a third straight season. Besides his spring SponsorJordan.com initiative, Anderson received additional help throughout the season from former NASCAR driver Kenny Wallace after Gateway and ran another fan-funded campaign to close out the season.

On January 31, 2018, Anderson announced his intentions to run full-time in the 2018 NASCAR Camping World Truck Series season using the number 3 and running under his own Jordan Anderson Racing banner. Anderson chose the number 3 in connection with Junior Johnson. JAR acquired trucks from Niece Motorsports, who switched from Toyota to Chevrolet before 2018 and Brad Keselowski Racing, who ceased operations at the end of 2017. As for the first half of the 2018 season Anderson has an average finish of 19.7th and is 2 top 20 finishes away from tying his record of 8 top 20 finishes from the 2016 season. In early July at the Charlotte Motor Speedway during Roval testing it was announced that Ryan Newman would race for the team at Eldora.

For the 2019 season, Anderson competed a full schedule in the Truck Series in his No. 3 JAR truck with the exception of Eldora, where Carson Hocevar drove the No. 3. JAR signed Wally Rogers as crew chief midway through the 2019 season.

In the 2020 season opener at Daytona, Anderson nearly won his first Truck race when he escaped numerous wrecks. On the final lap, he passed leader Grant Enfinger as they exited turn four, but Enfinger hindered his momentum by hitting his door, enabling Enfinger to win as Anderson finished a career-best second.

Anderson moved his team to a full-time Xfinity schedule ahead of the 2021 season, though he continued racing in the Truck Series on a part-time basis. In the Daytona Truck race, Anderson once again finished second when he was beat to the finish by Ben Rhodes, also a ThorSport Racing driver like Enfinger. He did not make the field for the following day's Xfinity opener when rain canceled qualifying. As a result, he would also fail to qualify for the next nine races as qualifying would not resume (due to the COVID-19 pandemic) until the inaugural Pit Boss 250 at the Circuit of the Americas on May 22. On May 4, he switched to Truck Series points in order to compete in the week's Truck race at Darlington; the event was a Triple Truck Challenge round that only allowed the series' points-eligible drivers. He finished 10th. Anderson would eventually scale to a part-time Xfinity schedule due to making room for more drivers.

At the Talladega playoff race on October 1, 2022, Anderson survived a fiery crash, sustaining second degree burns on his body.

Personal life
Anderson graduated from Belmont Abbey College in Belmont, North Carolina, with a degree in business and marketing, and is said to be one of the hardest-working drivers in the sport, with his hands-on, grassroots approach to his career and sponsorship.

In January 2021, Anderson became engaged to Kendall McReynolds, the daughter of former crew chief and NASCAR on Fox analyst Larry McReynolds. The couple was married in April 2022.

Motorsports career results

NASCAR
(key) (Bold – Pole position awarded by qualifying time. Italics – Pole position earned by points standings or practice time. * – Most laps led.)

Xfinity Series

Camping World Truck Series

K&N Pro Series East

 Season still in progress
 Ineligible for series points
 Switched from Xfinity to Truck points before the spring Darlington race

References

External links
 
 NASCAR.com bio
 

1991 births
Living people
NASCAR drivers
People from Richland County, South Carolina
Belmont Abbey College alumni
Racing drivers from South Carolina